Mala Fama, Buena Vidha is the second album produced by Mauricio Garza, released June 22, 2018.

Track listing
 Mala Fama, Buena Vidha 
 Te Gustan Los Malos
 Mala Vibra
 Hey Morra
 Es El Pinche Dharius
 La Durango 
 Me Voy A Poner Bien Loco
 Allá Por Cd. Juarez
 Ando Bien Amanecido
 Un Camión Lleno de Puras de Esas
 De Party Sin Ti
 Perro Loco

References

2018 albums
Dharius albums
Rhythm and blues albums by Mexican artists